WCRX (88.1 FM) is a radio station based in Chicago, Illinois. WCRX is a non-commercial campus radio station owned and operated by Columbia College Chicago. The station is located at 33 East Congress in Chicago and operated by students in the school's radio department. WCRX provides music, news, sports, and community affairs programming.

History

University of Illinois at Chicago

The WCRX license was established as WUIC, the radio station of the University of Illinois at Chicago Circle, in June 1975. The station broadcast eight hours a day.

Columbia College Chicago

The university filed to sell WUIC to sold the station to Columbia on August 25, 1982. Upon taking control in November, the station received new WCRX call letters.

References

External links

Radio Alumni
WCRX History
FCC History Cards for WCRX

Columbia College Chicago
CRX
CRX
Radio stations established in 1975
1975 establishments in Illinois